Hill County is a county located in the U.S. state of Montana. As of the 2020 census, the population was 16,309. Its county seat is Havre. It lies along the United States border with Canada, abutting Alberta and Saskatchewan.

Part of its territory is within the Rocky Boy Indian Reservation, which is held by the federally recognized Chippewa-Cree Tribe.

History
The first European-American settlement in the future county area was Fort Assinniboine, garrisoned by the United States Army in 1879. Fifteen of the original 104 structures from the fort are still standing. A portion of the fort was ceded for use as the Indian reservation, which was established in 1916.

The county is named after James J. Hill, president of the Great Northern Railway Company, which built the rail line across Montana as part of the Transcontinental Railroad to the Pacific coast.

Geography

Hill County is on the "Hi-Line" in north-central Montana. It borders Blaine County to the east, Liberty County to the west, and Canada to the north. Hill County contains Beaver Creek Park, the nation's largest county park.

It is one of the few locations in the United States to have an antipodal point on land, and its community of Rudyard is the only populated such place. The Kerguelen Islands are on the opposite side of the earth from parts of Hill County, while the antipodal points of almost all other places in the United States lie in the Indian Ocean.

Adjacent counties and rural municipalities

 Liberty County - west
 Chouteau County - south
 Blaine County - east
 County of Forty Mile No. 8, Alberta - northwest
 Cypress County, Alberta - north
 Rural Municipality of Reno No. 51, Saskatchewan - northeast

Major highways
  U.S. Route 2
  U.S. Route 87

National protected areas
 Creedman Coulee National Wildlife Refuge
 Lake Thibadeau National Wildlife Refuge

Politics
In presidential elections, Hill County is a swing county. Since 1952, it has voted for the Democratic nominee nine times and the Republican nominee nine times.

Demographics

2000 census
As of the 2000 United States census, there were 16,673 people, 6,457 households, and 4,255 families living in the county. The population density was 6 people per square mile (2/km2). There were 7,453 housing units at an average density of 3 per square mile (1/km2). The racial makeup of the county was 79.55% White, 17.30% Native American, 0.37% Asian, 0.02% Pacific Islander, 0.35% from other races, 0.09% Black or African American, and 2.32% from two or more races. 1.25% of the population were Hispanic or Latino of any race. 21.1% were of German, 13.5% Norwegian, 8.7% Irish, 6.7% American and 6.2% English ancestry. 93.9% spoke English, 3.3% Cree and 2.0% German as their first language.

There were 6,457 households, out of which 34.30% had children under the age of 18 living with them, 50.50% were married couples living together, 10.90% had a female householder with no husband present, and 34.10% were non-families. 28.60% of all households were made up of individuals, and 11.40% had someone living alone who was 65 years of age or older. The average household size was 2.53 and the average family size was 3.15.

The county population contained 28.20% under the age of 18, 11.60% from 18 to 24, 26.00% from 25 to 44, 21.40% from 45 to 64, and 12.80% who were 65 years of age or older. The median age was 34 years. For every 100 females there were 99.30 males. For every 100 females age 18 and over, there were 96.40 males.

The median income for a household in the county was $30,781, and the median income for a family was $38,179. Males had a median income of $29,908 versus $19,874 for females. The per capita income for the county was $14,935. About 15.30% of families and 18.40% of the population were below the poverty line, including 23.30% of those under age 18 and 9.00% of those age 65 or over.

2010 census
As of the 2010 United States census, there were 16,096 people, 6,275 households, and 4,020 families living in the county. The racial makeup of the county was 73.9% white, 21.7% American Indian, 0.4% Asian, 0.3% black or African American, 0.3% from other races, and 3.3% from two or more races. Those of Hispanic or Latino origin made up 2.3% of the population. In terms of ancestry, 28.9% were German, 18.5% were Norwegian, 12.7% were Irish, 9.2% were English, and 3.0% were American.

Of the 6,275 households, 32.5% had children under the age of 18 living with them, 46.3% were married couples living together, 11.9% had a female householder with no husband present, 35.9% were non-families, and 29.8% of all households were made up of individuals. The average household size was 2.47 and the average family size was 3.10. The median age was 35.1 years.

The median income for a household in the county was $43,606 and the median income for a family was $55,963. Males had a median income of $44,286 versus $28,908 for females. The per capita income for the county was $21,420. About 12.4% of families and 17.9% of the population were below the poverty line, including 24.0% of those under age 18 and 9.6% of those age 65 or over.

Communities

City
 Havre (county seat)

Town
 Hingham

Census-designated places

 Azure
 Beaver Creek
 Box Elder
 East End Colony
 Gildford
 Gildford Colony
 Havre North
 Herron
 Hilldale Colony
 Inverness
 Kremlin
 Laredo
 Parker School
 Rocky Boy West
 Rocky Boy's Agency
 Rudyard
 Saddle Butte
 St. Pierre
 Sangrey
 West Havre

Unincorporated communities

 Agency
 Goldstone
 Simpson

See also
 List of lakes in Hill County, Montana
 List of mountains in Hill County, Montana
 National Register of Historic Places listings in Hill County MT

References

External links
 

 
1912 establishments in Montana
Populated places established in 1912